Athlétic Club Amiens is a French association football club founded in 1977. They are currently playing in the Championnat National 3 the fifth tier of the French football league system. They play at the Stade Jean Bouin, which seats 1,200 people.

Current squad

Season results

References

 
Football clubs in France
Association football clubs established in 1977
1977 establishments in France
Sport in Amiens
Football clubs in Hauts-de-France